Slatine is a village on Čiovo, an island in Split-Dalmatia County, Croatia. It is a small fishing and tourist village situated on the northeastern side of the island Čiovo, only 8 km from Trogir. It lies on the coast of Kaštela bay, opposite Split and peninsula Marjan, which are to the east. There are 1,106 inhabitants in the settlement (2011 census).

Infrastructure
The village is in the Split metropolitan area with the city being responsible for the villages electricity, water and up until recently garbage disposal. a small road links Slatine with the rest of the island and the village is serviced by a bus link and in the summer months by a small ferry.

Services
Slatine has a baker, a post office and a small supermarket. The village also had a small primary school, a kindergarten. The village is serviced by a local volunteer fire service and has a church and a monastery nearby. Slatine has numerous restaurants and beach bars giving it popularity with locals and tourist for its nightlife.

Tourism
Slatine is popular with tourists particularly with locals and Germans. The village has a long beach and many hotel apartments.

References

Populated places in Split-Dalmatia County
Populated coastal places in Croatia